Yeh Zindagi is a single Hindi song sung by Rahat Fateh Ali Khan. Written and music by Sahir Ali Bagga.

Release 
On 16 February 2018 the song's official video was released. The song was available exclusively on Idea Music for first 2 days, on 18 February 2018 it was released at all other online music stores including iTunes.

References

External links 

 
 Proper Patola will cement our relationship with Diljit Dosanjh: Sanujeet Bhujabal

Hindi-language songs
2018 songs
Rahat Fateh Ali Khan songs